Waterfront, New Jersey can refer to:
Camden Waterfront in Camden, New Jersey
Hudson Waterfront in Hudson County, New Jersey
Lamberton, New Jersey, also known as Waterfront, in Trenton, New Jersey